The 1898 Marshall Thundering Herd football team represented Marshall University in the 1898 college football season. The team did not have a coach, and outscored their opponents 40–11 in four games (with one forfeit win) en route to the school's first winning season.

The 1898 season contained two major firsts in Marshall football history: the first win (on Oct. 22 against Kingsbury High School) and the first away game (on Nov. 9 in Catlettsburg, Kentucky).

Schedule

References

Marshall
Marshall Thundering Herd football seasons
Marshall Thundering Herd football